Montauk is the terminus of the Montauk Branch of the Long Island Rail Road, as well as the easternmost railroad station on Long Island and in New York state. The station is located on Edgemere Street (Suffolk County Route 49) and Fort Pond Road west of Montauk Harbor, New York.

History

Originally built in 1895 by the Brooklyn and Montauk Railroad, it was demolished in 1907, then rebuilt twenty years later, only to be relocated by the US Navy during World War II along with a great deal of Montauk itself. The Navy confiscated the property along Fort Pond Bay in order to transform it into a sea plane base, and moved the LIRR property to the south with a third station built in 1942. The station was built in a similar style to the second station, but not the same design. Both the second and third stations still survive to this day, and for a while the second one was owned by the New York Ocean Science Laboratory. Today the second station is on the property of the Roughrider Landing Condominiums. The third station house also contained a freight house that was moved to Industrial Road in the late-1960s, and is now a private residence.

The current and fourth Montauk station is an unoccupied high-level center platform for two of the seven tracks. The platform from the old station leads to the current station. A wye exists west of the station that leads to a short spur across Industrial Road to Fort Pond, and was used to turn around engines. It also once had another spur on the opposite side of the tracks leading to a fishing dock on Fort Pond Bay. The previous station house is now known as the Depot Art Gallery. Montauk Station was one of the settings for the 2004 movie Eternal Sunshine of the Spotless Mind starring Jim Carrey and Kate Winslet.

The noise of train engines left idling for long periods in the Montauk Yard has been a recent cause of concern for local residents, who formed a group called the Montauk Anti-Pollution Coalition in 2003. The LIRR began shutting engines off in 2009.

Station layout
This station has one six-car-long high-level island platform. There are seven tracks at this location. The five southern tracks, not adjacent to the platform, comprise a train storage yard. When the LIRR provides extra service to the Hamptons during the summer, on weekends the yard is typically filled with passenger trains that terminate at Montauk, including the Friday afternoon Cannonball express train from Penn Station.

See also
Montauk Point land claim

References

External links

Unofficial LIRR History Website
Babylon-Montauk Branch Stations
1942-style Montauk Station
LIRR Train 2704 on the approach to Montauk (YouTube)
Unofficial LIRR Photography Site
Montauk Station
 old Station House from Google Maps Street View

Long Island Rail Road stations in Suffolk County, New York
East Hampton (town), New York
Railway stations in the United States opened in 1895